Ulf Sauerbrey (born 27 August 1961) is a retired German rower who won one gold and one silver medal in the coxless pairs at the world championships of 1982–1983, rowing with Carl Ertel.

References

1961 births
Living people
East German male rowers
World Rowing Championships medalists for East Germany
Sportspeople from Halle (Saale)